Fresh Air Basketball is a professional basketball club based in Brussels, Belgium

History
Fresh Air is the basketball section of the Fresh Air Tennis Club. The club became a considerable force in the post-war Belgian basketball at the late '70s winning the Belgian league two consecutive times in a row (1978, 1979). In the 1978–79 season Fresh Air begun to play also in the Belgian Cup final but it lost the game to Sunair Oostende (66–77).

Honours and titles
Belgian League
 Champions (4): 1936–37, 1937–38, 1977–78, 1978–79
Belgian Cup
 Runners-up (1): 1978–79
Belgian Supercup
 Winners (1): 1979

References

External links
Official site

Fresh Air Basketball
Sport in Brussels